Tartine is a small, US-based bakery chain. As of February 2022, it operates three locations in the San Francisco Bay Area, five in Los Angeles, and six in Seoul, South Korea. Its original bakery opened in 2002 in San Francisco's Mission District, at 600 Guerrero Street.

History

Tartine (the word means "open faced sandwich" in French) opened in 2002, on the site of two previous bakeries, Carl's Bakery, then Lady Baltimore Bakery. Elisabeth Prueitt and Chad Robertson, its owners, had previously run the Wood-Fire Baking in Point Reyes and Bay Village Breads in Mill Valley. After the success of their San Francisco bakery they also opened the nearby Bar Tartine in 2006 and published a book of recipes from their bakery.

Awards and recognition
In 2007, New York Times food columnist Mark Bittman called Tartine his favorite bakery in the U.S.

In 2008, its owners won James Beard Foundation Awards as the best pastry chefs in America, after previously being nominated for this award in 2006 and 2007.

Vandalism
As part of a May Day demonstration and riot in 2012, anarchists vandalized the bakery and broke its windows.

Blue Bottle Coffee Company merger attempt
In April 2015, it was announced that Tartine's bakery operations would merge with Blue Bottle Coffee and that the Bar Tartine restaurant would be sold to its chefs. However, the merger was called off later the same year.

Expansion
The bakery chain saw a period of rapid expansion in the late 2010s, opening further locations in the Bay Area as well as opening new locations in Los Angeles and South Korea. A large "Manufactury" complex in Los Angeles was shut down in December 2019, after operating for less than a year, but as of February 2020, three LA locations remain open, with two additional ones still planned to launch. At that time, Tartine had five Bay Area facilities: the original bakery at Guerrero and 18th, the "Manufactory" (also in the Mission District), one in the San Francisco's Inner Sunset, one in Berkeley (with around 215 employees at these four locations), and another one at San Francisco International Airport.

Tartine hired Chris Jordan, a Starbucks executive, as a COO who developed a partnership with CIM Group, a real-estate private-equity firm, for amenity-oriented anchor tenancies, at CIM real-estate.

Safety issues
In November 2019, Tartine's Guerrero St. location was briefly shut down by the San Francisco Department of Public Health after inspectors say that its operators failed to address a persistent rodent infestation in the space. The location was reopened the following week, with the owners citing the building's age as a key issue.

Unionization efforts
In early 2020, 141 employees across three of Tartine's San Francisco locations signed a letter declaring their intent to join the International Longshore and Warehouse Union (ILWU) in hopes of getting better pay and a fairer balance of power between workers and management.

In response to the unionization efforts, Elisabeth Prueitt said she's pro-union in many cases but wants to keep Tartine union-free, in part because she believes Tartine already provides fair wages and strong benefits.

Tartine workers voted on forming a union during March 2020. Following litigation regarding 24 challenged votes, Tartine's workers were officially unionised on March 30, 2021 - over a year after voting - with 93 workers in favour of the union, and 90 against.

In May 2022, Tartine Union began negotiations for the first wage and healthcare contract, and as of 23 August 2022 are stalled.

Works

References

External links

Tartine Union
Tartine’s Country Bread recipe adapted by The New York Times

Restaurants in San Francisco
Bakeries of California
Mission District, San Francisco
Restaurants established in 2002
2001 establishments in California